Queenstown (named after Queen Victoria), officially Komani, is a town in the middle of the Eastern Cape Province of South Africa, roughly halfway between the smaller towns of Cathcart and Sterkstroom on the N6 National Route. The town was established in 1853 and is currently the commercial, administrative, and educational centre of the surrounding farming district.

History
Queenstown was founded in early 1853 under the direction of Sir George Cathcart, who named the settlement, and then fort, after Queen Victoria. Work on its railway connection to East London on the coast was begun by the Cape government of John Molteno in 1876, and the line was officially opened on 19 May 1880.

The town war memorial was designed by Sir Robert Lorimer in 1922 with its sculpture by Alice Meredith Williams.

The town prospered from its founding up to the worldwide depression of the 1930s, and again thereafter. In the 1960s, the majority of the Black population were moved east to the township of Ezibeleni, as part of the attempt to move African people to so-called "homelands". The area has in the past had very severe weather problems, luckily, often only affecting the surrounding areas. In 2002, heavy snowfall around Queenstown caused a severe disaster, especially since the area was not funded or ready for such a disaster. Then, in 2004, the surrounding areas of the Eastern Cape were affected by strong winds and heavy rainfall, although Queenstown once again escaped much flooding and some wind damage, power shortages soon followed. Other natural disasters include droughts and veld fires (wildfires).

The name of the town was changed to Komani in February 2016.

Education
The following high schools serve the town and surrounding areas:
Hexagon High School
Queen's College
Get Ahead Project and College
Queenstown Girls' High School
Hangklip High School
JJ Serfontein High School
KwaKomani Comprehensive
Maria Louw High School, 
Nkwanca High School
Luvuyo Lerumo High School
John Noah High School
W.B. Rubusana High School
Bulelani High School

Primary schools in the area include:
St. Theresa's Primary School
Hangklip Primary
Balmoral Girls' Primary School
Queens College Primary
Southbourne Primary
Thembelihle Primary School
Lukhanji Primary School
Christ The King 
Mpendulo Primary School
Edlelweni Primary School
Nonesi Primary School
Van Coller Public Primary School
Royal Capital Education Centre

Tertiary education institutions in Queenstown include 
Walter Sisulu University,
 Ikhala Public FET College,
Boston City Campus and Business College
Lukhanji FET College.

Religion
The city is the seat of the Roman Catholic Diocese of Queenstown as well as the Anglican Church's Diocese of Ukhahlamba. The imposing Cathedral of St. Michael lies adjacent to the town's public gardens. Churches of all faith denominations are to be found in and around the town.

Geography

The town lies on the Komani River which forms part of the Great Kei system of rivers and has a refreshing climate and plentiful water supply from the surrounding rugged mountains. The water is collected in the Bongolo Dam, set in the hills, used extensively for recreation and watersports. Each year, around the beginning of June, the town holds an art exhibition with the emphasis on paintings and sculpture. Perhaps inspired by some of the most interesting Bushman paintings in nearby caves, which are accessible to the visitor.

Close to the town is a nature reserve (Lawrence de Lange Game Reserve) with numerous antelope, white rhinoceros and spectacular flowering plants together with panoramic views from the mountain summit.

Layout

The layout of the town reflects its original objective as a defensive stronghold for the frontier area and has a most unusual design. There is a central hexagonal area where canon or rifle fire could be directed down six thoroughfares radiating from the centre. The canon sites have now been replaced with gardens and a central fountain was the dominant feature. A striking abstract sculpture replaced the fountain as part of the town's 150th anniversary. The hexagon still exists, with the outer road surrounding it named Robinson Road, which encircles it. Surrounding the Hexagon to the east and west lies more commercial and administrative facilities.

Currently, formerly 'white suburbs' (Sandringham, Kingsway, Windsor, Bergsig, Blue rise, Balmoral, Madeira Park and a new fast-growing suburb of Komani Park) surround the hexagon to the north, east and west, however, one of the city's great townships (and squatter camps) lies to the south. It is a collection of black and coloured townships named Mlungisi, Aloevale, a new township, Victoria Park has been built to the south-east of the city. East of the town lies the much larger Ezibeleni township, which although roughly the same surface area as the main town, has by far a larger population.

Climate 
Queenstown has a cold semi-arid climate (Köppen climate classification: BSk), that borders on a subtropical highland climate (Köppen climate classification: Cfb), and a humid subtropical climate (Köppen climate classification: Cfa).

Geology
The Queenstown area is in the Burgersdorp Formation of the Tarkastad sub group, in the upper Beaufort Group Triassic in age in the karoo super group. The lithology is red mudstone 1 to 10 m rich layers and sub-ordinate 1 to 2 m rich sandstone layers deposited by meandering rivers in the flood plain in an oxidising environment gradually filling the Karoo basin. The formation reaches thickness of 600 m in the Komani (Queenstown) and Lady Frere area. Numerous dolerite dykes and ring structures intruded the area creating good localities for ground water exploration.

Media
The town has a newspaper called The Representative, fondly known as the Rep, as well as The Express and a community radio station, Lukhanji fm. The Eastern Cape newspaper, Daily Dispatch, is widely read in the area.

Coats of arms

The Queenstown municipal council assumed a pseudo-heraldic coat of arms in October 1902. The shield was quartered, and depicted (1) the Union Jack, (2) a landscape with hangklip mountain in the background, (3) a landscape with a mimosa tree in the foreground, and (4) a portrait of King Edward VII.  The crest was a demi-antelope, and the motto Unity is strength. The council later assumed a new coat of arms.  The new shield displayed a golden royal coronet on a red background.  The crest was the same as before, but the motto was translated into Latin as Ex unitate vires.

Notable people
Linky Boshoff
Lionel Cronje
Daryll Cullinan
Carlo Del Fava
Allan Dell
Glen Dell
Mongezi Feza
Ian Greig
Tony Greig
Justin Kemp
Robbi Kempson
Rayne Kruger (1922–2002), author
Kaya Malotana
Ken McEwan
Pat Matshikiza
Todd Matshikiza
Stompie Mavi
Lwazi Mvovo
Don Pinnock
Olive Schreiner
Margaret Singana
Minah Soga
Jomo Sono
Stratford Edward St Leger
Marius Corbett

References

Populated places in the Enoch Mgijima Local Municipality
1853 establishments in the Cape Colony
Populated places established in 1853